Motto Motto may refer to:

 "Motto Motto..." (song), a 1995 single by Ryōko Shinohara
 "Motto Motto" (song), a 1999 single by Zeppet Store
 "Motto Motto" (song), a 2002 song by Ayako Ikeda off the album Water Colors (album)
 "Motto Motto" (song), a 2003 song by Hitomi Momoi off the album Kaeru no Uta
 "Motto Motto" (song), a 2015 single by Tritops

See also

 Motto Motto Motto, a 2003 manga graphic novel by Kazumi Kazui

 Motomoto (disambiguation)
 Motto (disambiguation)
 Moto (disambiguation)
 More (disambiguation)